Mary Ayaq Anowtalik (born 1938) is an Inuit artist known for her stone carvings.

Her work is included in the collections of the Winnipeg Art Gallery, the Musée national des beaux-arts du Québec, and the University of British Columbia Museum of Anthropology.

In 1957 she was part of a community of Nunavut residents who were forcibly relocated from Ennadai Lake, Nunavut.

References

1938 births
20th-century Canadian women artists
21st-century Canadian women artists
Living people
Inuit artists